Courage to Change is an American political action committee launched by U.S. Representative Alexandria Ocasio-Cortez to elect progressive challenger candidates. The PAC was first announced in January 2020 and the next month, endorsed seven women running for congressional seats. Courage to Change made $160,000 in contributions in the first quarter of 2021. The PAC did not give to endangered Democrats in the second quarter of 2021, following an issue in the first quarter in which those campaigns sought to return unsolicited donations from Ocasio-Cortez to avoid blowback from affiliation with her.

Candidates

References

External links 

 

United States political action committees
Alexandria Ocasio-Cortez